The 2002 Dallas Cowboys season was the 43rd season for the team in the National Football League. It was Emmitt Smith's 13th and final season with the team, officially marking the end of the famed "triplets" tenure in Dallas after wide receiver Michael Irvin was forced to retire prematurely after the 1999 season and quarterback Troy Aikman retired prior to the start of the 2001 season. All three players would eventually be inducted to the Pro Football Hall of Fame. It was also the last of three consecutive 5–11 finishes for the Cowboys, which began in 2000. Texas Stadium also saw new RealGrass Turf surface by week 5, replacing the AstroTurf.

Offseason 

Despite an off-season filled with promise, the season would again prove to be a disaster. Former Cincinnati Bengals offensive coordinator and head coach Bruce Coslet was brought in to run the offense for Dallas. Even though he had been dismissed by Cincinnati, his history of high-powered offenses while running the Bill Walsh–style West Coast offense provided hope for the Cowboys. A promising draft which included former Oklahoma Sooners All-American selection safety Roy Williams in the first round and the free agent addition of Pro Bowl defensive tackle La'Roi Glover provided even more hope for weary Cowboy fans. The team was also covered throughout training camp and featured on the HBO series Hard Knocks with a strong emphasis on the anticipation of running back Emmitt Smith's road to the NFL's all-time rushing record.

2002 draft class 

Notes
 The Cowboys traded their original first-round (No. 6 overall) selection to the Kansas City Chiefs in exchange for first (No. 8 overall) and third-round (No. 75 overall) selections, and a 2003 sixth-round (No. 186 overall) selection.
 The Cowboys traded their original third (No. 72 overall), fourth (No. 104 overall) and fifth-round (No. 140 overall) selections to the Chicago Bears in exchange for second (No. 63 overall) and fourth-round (No. 129 overall) selections.
 The Cowboys traded return man Jeff Ogden to the Miami Dolphins in exchange for a seventh-round (No. 237 overall) selection.
 The Cowboys traded their seventh-round (No. 237 overall) and 2003 fifth-round (No. 168 overall) selection to the New England Patriots for a fifth-round (No. 168 overall) selection.
 The Cowboys traded their 2001 fourth-round (No. 102 overall) and 2002 seventh-round (No. 217 overall) selections to the Atlanta Falcons in exchange for tight end O.J. Santiago.

Undrafted free agents

Regular season 
The air was immediately let out of the Cowboys' balloon in the opening regular-season contest which saw the team lose to first-year expansion team and new cross-state rival, the Houston Texans. Though quarterback Quincy Carter again opened the season as the starter, he was eventually benched in favor of newly signed Chad Hutchinson who, until that year, had been a pitcher for the St. Louis Cardinals after leaving Stanford as a two-sport star. Many believed that owner Jerry Jones pressured head coach Dave Campo into starting Hutchinson much too early, due in part to the large signing bonus Jones paid to acquire the quarterback. Regardless, neither quarterback proved effective and the team once again spiraled towards a losing season.

It is believed 2002 was the first time an NFL franchise had five African American starters on their offensive line, when the Cowboys lined up rookie center Andre Gurode, tackles Flozell Adams and Solomon Page, guards Larry Allen and Kelvin Garmon.

The Cowboys kept making NFL history on October 27 at home against the Seattle Seahawks. Despite a close loss, Emmitt Smith broke the all-time career yardage rushing record previously held by Walter Payton. The game was stopped momentarily in recognition of the moment, allowing an emotional Smith to briefly celebrate with teammates both current and past who attended the game, as well as members of Payton's family. Smith later scored the 125th rushing touchdown of his career on the same drive. The milestone moment would provide the lone bright spot of the year for the team and Smith, who failed to reach the 1,000-yard rushing mark for the season for the first time in his career since his rookie season of 1990. Overshadowed by the NFL rushing landmark, safety Darren Woodson quietly became the Cowboys' all-time leading tackler.

During a late-season loss to the Philadelphia Eagles, reports began to surface that owner Jerry Jones had secretly met with Bill Parcells, the former head coach of the New York Giants, New England Patriots and New York Jets, about the Cowboys' head-coaching position, on board Jones's private jet. Though this would prove to be a critical move to the Cowboys' future success, it was nonetheless embarrassing for current head coach Dave Campo, who had received no word that any potential moves were pending, and Jones was roundly criticized for the incident. On-field ineptitude and off-field controversy once again led to a 5–11 season, the team's third consecutive such finish. Dave Campo was predictably dismissed after the season.

Notable additions to the team included wide receiver Antonio Bryant and center Andre Gurode.

Schedule 

Note: Intra-division opponents are in bold text.

Game summaries

Week 2: vs. Tennessee Titans

Week 9: at Detroit Lions

Week 12 vs. Jacksonville Jaguars

Standings

Personnel

Staff

Roster

Awards and records 
 Darren Woodson, Athletes in Action/Bart Starr Award

Publications 
The Football Encyclopedia 
Total Football 
Cowboys Have Always Been My Heroes

References

External links 
 2002 Dallas Cowboys
 Pro Football Hall of Fame
 Dallas Cowboys Official Site

Dallas Cowboys seasons
Dallas
Dallas